Ron Wilson (born 7 January 1954) is a former Scotland international rugby union player. His regular playing position was Fly half.

Rugby Union career

Amateur career

He went to Fettes College and was described as having a 'strong and accurate kick' at fly-half.

Wilson played for and captained London Scottish.

Provincial career

He played for the Anglo-Scots district.

International career

His first and only cap for Scotland 'B' came on 18 January 1975 against France 'B'.

He had 9 full senior caps for Scotland from 1976 to 1983.

References

1954 births
Living people
Scottish rugby union players
Scotland international rugby union players
Rugby union fly-halves
London Scottish F.C. players
Scotland 'B' international rugby union players
Scottish Exiles (rugby union) players
Middlesex County RFU players